Tuřany is a municipality and village in Kladno District in the Central Bohemian Region of the Czech Republic. It has about 700 inhabitants.

Administrative parts
The village of Byseň is an administrative part of Tuřany.

References

Villages in Kladno District